Bozok University is a university located in Yozgat, Turkey. It was established in 2006.

Affiliations
The University is a member of the Balkan Universities Network and Caucasus University Association.

References

External links

Universities and colleges in Turkey
Educational institutions established in 2006
State universities and colleges in Turkey
2006 establishments in Turkey
Yozgat